Chris Edwards (born 1965) is an American politician. He served as a Republican member of the Nevada Assembly.

Early life
Chris Edwards was born in 1965 in Sleepy Hollow, New York. He graduated from University of Notre Dame, where he received a bachelor of arts degree in political science. He received a master of accountancy degree from George Washington University.

Career
Edwards has served in the United States Navy since 1987 and attained the rank of commander. His first attempt at running for public office was in 2012, as a candidate for Nevada's 1st Congressional District. He has served as a Republican member of the Nevada Assembly, where he represented District 19, which includes Mesquite, Overton, Nellis Air Force Base, part of Sunrise Manor and eastern Henderson, from November 5, 2014 to November 4, 2020.

References

1965 births
Living people
People from Sleepy Hollow, New York
Politicians from Las Vegas
Notre Dame College of Arts and Letters alumni
George Washington University School of Business alumni
United States Navy officers
Republican Party members of the Nevada Assembly
21st-century American politicians